Traeth Mawr Loop was a run round loop on the Welsh Highland Railway (WHR), located to the north of Porthmadog, Wales.

Track laying was completed by November 2006, making it the northern limit of track from Porthmadog. The location was opened as a temporary terminus on 23 March 2007 by the Welsh Highland Railway (Porthmadog), but passengers were unable to board or alight here.

The last public service to terminate at Traeth Mawr ran on 28 October 2007. Welsh Highland Railway (Porthmadog) trains ran in push-pull mode to a point just south of Farmyard Farm Crossing, for some time afterwards.

Shortly after this time, the loop was removed in order to construct the new main line building southwards. On 31 August 2008, the final length of track from the Caernarfon direction was laid at the location of the former loop. The line from Pen-y-mount to Traeth Mawr was removed from operational service at the end of the 2008 season.

Regular passenger trains through the site of Traeth Mawr Loop re-commenced, from Porthmadog Harbour on 4 January 2011.

References

Notes

Sources 
Pont Croesor Extension
The Welsh Highland Railway Project

Welsh Highland Railway
Porthmadog